Second Summit Conference of Heads of State or Government of the Non-Aligned Movement on 5–10 October 1964 in Cairo, United Arab Republic (Egypt) was the second conference of the Non-Aligned Movement which followed the Belgrade Conference of 1961 and preceded the Lusaka Conference of 1970. The city of Cairo was selected as a host of the summit conference at the preparatory meeting held in Colombo, Ceylon, on March 23, 1964. At the beginning of the conference the chairmanship of the Movement was transferred from the President of Yugoslavia Josip Broz Tito to the President of Egypt Gamal Abdel Nasser.

Issues discussed

Universalist and Regionalist approach to membership
One of the prominent issues resolved at the Cairo conference was the disagreement on membership in the movement where Yugoslavia advocated for universalist approach (in which movement would be open to all the non-aligned countries regardless of geography, notably in Europe and Latin America) while Indonesia at the time advocated for a narrower Afro-Asian regionalism. The Indonesian approach, strongly supported by China, wanted to use Non-Alignement as a continuation of the regionalist Bandung Conference. At the time, the two approaches both overlapped and competed with Indonesian-Chinese plan to organize the Second Bandung Conference in late 1963 or early 1964 and Indian, Egyptian and Yugoslav plan for the second Non-Aligned conference. Indonesia and China strongly criticized the idea of the Non-Aligned conference as counterproductive to Bandung while Prime Minister of Sri Lanka Sirimavo Bandaranaike confronted those criticisms by stressing indivisibility of the World peace. The situation created parallelism in initiatives with preparatory meeting for the Second Non-Aligned Summit taking place in Colombo and the Second Bandung preparatory meeting taking place with delay in Jakarta. The Second Bandung preparatory meeting was ultimatelly supported only by Ghana, Iran, Cambodia, Guinea and Mali in which Cambodia, Guinea and Mali supported both initiatives. Participants of the second Bandung preparatory meeting proposed that the second meeting should take place in Africa on 10 March 1965 in a country determined by the Organization of African Unity yet it never took place due to Sino-Soviet split and 1965 Algerian coup d'état.

Participants 
All 25 countries participating in Belgrade Conference were invited to attend the conference in Cairo as well as all Charter of the Organization of African Unity parties, Arab countries in attendance of the 1964 Arab League Summit as well as Malawi, Laos, Jamaica, Trinidad and Tobago, Argentina, Bolivia, Brazil, Chile, Mexico, Uruguay, Venezuela, Austria, Finland, and Sweden while invitation of Zambia and British Guiana was conditioned on the declaration of independence by October 1964. Provisional government of Holden Roberto and other African provisional governments were invited as well.

Member States 
Following countries participated as a full member states.

Observers 
Following countries participated as observers.

See also 
 Egypt and the Non-Aligned Movement
 Foreign relations of Egypt

References 

Summit 2rd
Foreign relations of Egypt
Conferences in Cairo
Non-Aligned Movement
Summit of the Non-Aligned Movement
Summit of the Non-Aligned Movement
Summit of the Non-Aligned Movement